Hamerschlag is a surname. Notable people with the surname include:

Arthur Hamerschlag (1872–1927), American electrical and mechanical engineer and university president
Margarete Hamerschlag (1902–1958), Austrian artisan, painter, author, and illustrator

See also
Hammerschlag